Qayınlıq is a rural locality (a selo) in Biektaw District, Tatarstan. The population was 377 as of 2010.

Geography 
Qayınlıq, Vysokogorsky District is located 18 km northwest of Biektaw, district's administrative centre, and 44 km north of Qazan, republic's capital, by road.

History 
The village was established in 1930s.

After the creation of districts in Tatar ASSR (Tatarstan) in Döbyaz (1930s–1963),  Yäşel Üzän (1963–1965) and Biektaw districts.

References

External links 
 

Rural localities in Vysokogorsky District